Lyell is a lunar impact crater that lies along the eastern edge of the Mare Tranquillitatis, at the northern arm of the bay designated Sinus Concordiae. It was named after Scottish geologist Charles Lyell. To the north along the edge of the lunar mare is the crater Franz. The region of terrain to the east of Lyell is named Palus Somni.

The outer rim of this crater is an irregular series of ridges in a roughly circular formation. There are multiple gaps through this rim, connected the interior to the mare in the west. The wall is at its thickest along the eastern side of the crater.

The interior floor has been resurfaced by lava, leaving a level, featureless surface that has no markings or impacts of note. The central region of the inner floor has a relatively low albedo compared to the surrounding terrain, giving it a dark appearance that matches the nearby mare.

Satellite craters

By convention these features are identified on lunar maps by placing the letter on the side of the crater midpoint that is closest to Lyell.

References

External links

 LTO-61B1 Lyell — L&PI topographic map

Impact craters on the Moon